Etlaerravaly is a village and panchayat in Ranga Reddy district, Telangana, India. It falls under Shabad mandal. Its name is also written as "Yetla Yerravalli".

History

Languages
The major language spoken in Etlaerravally is Telugu. English and Hindi are occasionally used.

Crops
The place is suitable for harvesting tomatoes. Farmers also grow other crops including many flowers and vegetables, as well as rice, jowar, cotton, and corn.

Transport
This village has just the roadway and is 55 km from Hyderabad.

References

 https://web.archive.org/web/20111002092152/http://apland.ap.nic.in/AllPDF/15-PDF/L_1531003.PDF

Villages in Ranga Reddy district